Ligia cursor is a woodlouse in the family Ligiidae.

The antennae are as long as the cephalothorax, which is the head and body of the animal. Its flagellum contains 21 segments, 14 larger and 7 smaller, and each joint shows setae (small bristles).

Distribution
L. cursor was found on the United States Exploring Expedition of 1838–1842 under the command of Charles Wilkes, on the coast near Valparaíso, Chile.

References

External links

Woodlice
Crustaceans described in 1847